The Journal of Cellular Physiology is a peer-reviewed scientific journal focusing on all aspects of cellular physiology. The journal was previously established as Journal of Cellular and Comparative Physiology in 1932, but was renamed to its present title in 1966. The editor-in-chief is Gregg B. Fields (Florida Atlantic University).

Indexing

According to the Journal Citation Reports, the journal has a 2020 impact factor of 6.384, ranking it 56th out of 195 journals in the category "Cell Biology" and 7th out of 81 journals in the category "Physiology".

References

External links
Journal of Cellular Physiology Journal homepage
Journal of Cellular Physiology Online archive

Publications established in 1932
English-language journals
Wiley-Liss academic journals
Molecular and cellular biology journals